is a town located in Yame District, Fukuoka Prefecture, Japan.

As of May 1, 2017, the town has an estimated population of 19,865 and a density of 520 persons per km². The total area is 37.91 km².

References

External links

Hirokawa official website 

Towns in Fukuoka Prefecture